Ardajin (also Romanized as Ardajīn and Ardjīn; also known as Ardahīn and Ardin) is a village in Khorramdarreh Rural District, in the Central District of Khorramdarreh County, Zanjan Province, Iran. At the 2006 census, its population was 1,177, in 286 families.

References 

Populated places in Khorramdarreh County